Palyna is a genus of moths of the family Erebidae. The genus was erected by Achille Guenée in 1852.

Species
Palyna metagona Walker, 1858 Amazon region 
Palyna praegrandis Guenée, 1852 French Guiana
Palyna semilunaris Guenée, 1852 French Guiana

References

Calpinae